Caspar Ett (5 January 1788, Eresing – 16 May 1847, München) was a German composer and organist.

Life

In 1804 he completed his secondary studies at the "Paedagogium" in Munich, now called the Wilhelmsgymnasium. Ett studied at the Electoral Seminar in Munich and in 1816 became the court organist at St. Michael's Church. Ett is also credited in the revival of choral music from the 16th to the 18th century. He composed for the Catholic Church, but also works for Greek Orthodox and Jewish worship. He was the music teacher of King Maximilian II. A street was named after Caspar Ett in Eresing. In the Munich city centre there is also an 'Ettstraße'.

His grave is located in the Old South Cemetery in Munich.

Works

Attollite portas (Auferstehungs-Chor Ad resurrectionem Domini)
Haec dies
Pange lingua - Tantum ergo
Ave maris stella
Missa quadragesimalis
Ave vivans hostia
Laudate dominum
Iste confessor Jesu
Redemptor omnium
Prope est
Requiem
Cantica Sacra, München 1834 (Also in the hymn 'Pange Lingua', the tune being known in the English speaking world as 'Oriel', sung to the text 'To The Name Of Our Salvation')

Sources
 
 

1788 births
1847 deaths
German organists
German male organists
German music educators
Burials at the Alter Südfriedhof
19th-century German composers
19th-century German male musicians
19th-century organists